Shaun Richard Brisley (born 6 May 1990) is an English footballer who plays as a defender for  club Buxton.

He began his career at Macclesfield Town and quickly became a first-team regular after he made his senior debut in March 2008, going on to make 142 league and cup appearances in just under 4 years. He joined Peterborough United on an initial loan deal in February 2012, which was made permanent three months later. He won the Football League Trophy with the club in 2014 and scored in the final. He was loaned out to Scunthorpe United, Northampton Town and Leyton Orient, before he joined Carlisle United on a free transfer in July 2016. He moved on to Notts County 12 months later, though was released after the club's relegation out of the English Football League at the end of the 2018–19 season. He signed with Port Vale in August 2019 and stayed at the club for two seasons before joining Wrexham in July 2021. He moved on to Buxton 12 months later.

Career

Macclesfield Town
Brisley was born in Macclesfield and attended local schools Ivy Bank Primary School and Henbury High School. At the age of 13 he joined the Macclesfield Town youth-team and turned professional at the club at the age of 18. He made his professional debut on 1 March 2008, in a 1–1 draw with Notts County at Moss Rose that was also Keith Alexander's first game as manager. He scored his first 2 goals for the club in a 2–1 home victory over Accrington Stanley on 29 March. He ended the 2007–08 season with ten League Two appearances to his name. He went on to establish himself in the Macclesfield's defence, featuring 43 times across the 2008–09 campaign, scoring goals in both the League Cup and FA Cup. He scored 2 goals in 36 appearances in the 2009–10 season and was sent off for the first time in his career after committing a professional foul on Chris O'Grady in a 3–0 defeat at Rochdale on 5 December. In August 2010, Brisley suffered a hip injury which required surgery, keeping him out of action for four months. The injury was caused by an extra bit of bone on his thigh bone, which was trimmed down and smoothed out under the surgery. He returned to action and was put back into the first-team by manager Gary Simpson, ending the 2010–11 season with 16 appearances to his name. Chairman Mike Rance said that he was disappointed to lose Brisley to Peterborough but was proud of the way the centre-back had come all the way through the club's academy.

Peterborough United
On 20 February 2012, Brisley joined Championship side Peterborough United on an emergency loan with a view to a permanent deal when the transfer window opened in July. Manager Darren Ferguson said that he first attempted to sign the defender three seasons earlier but a then-teenaged Brisley suffered homesickness and returned to his hometown club. He made his debut for the "Posh" on 10 March, in a 3–1 win over Blackpool at London Road. The loan deal was made permanent on 8 May for "a fee in the region of £300,000". He played 31 games in the 2012–13 campaign as United were relegated into League One. He appeared 32 times in the 2013–14 campaign and on 30 March he scored what BBC Sport correspondent Ian Woodcock described as a "powerful headed goal" in the Football League Trophy final as Peterborough lifted the trophy with a 3–1 victory over Chesterfield at Wembley Stadium. However he was also sent off twice during the campaign, in league defeats at Walsall and Bradford City.

On 25 September 2014, he joined League One rivals Scunthorpe United on a one-month loan deal; manager Russ Wilcox said that he was surprised to land his number one target and that Brisley would cover for the suspended Miguel Llera. On 5 November, the loan was extended until 3 January. He played a total of seven games during his time at Glanford Park, though featured only three times after Mark Robins succeeded Wilcox as manager. He also played a total of 16 times for Peterborough during the 2014–15 season.

In June 2015, it was reported that he had been transfer-listed by new manager Dave Robertson. On 11 September, he joined Northampton Town of League Two for a one-month loan agreement. He admitted the loan move came as a surprise to him but was hopeful of getting game time at Sixfields. The loan was later extended into a second month, however was then cut short after he sustained medial ligament damage in his knee on 24 October and was sidelined for eight weeks; manager Chris Wilder said that the news was "disappointing because he's been superb for us". On 27 January, he returned to League Two on loan with Leyton Orient until the end of the 2015–16 season. He was named on the Football League team of the week after scoring the only goal of the game at Notts County on 20 February. He featured 16 times for Orient, scoring one goal, and said he would be interested in a permanent move to Brisbane Road.

Carlisle United
On 4 July 2016, Brisley signed a two-year contract with Carlisle United. He said that manager Keith Curle's 'sales pitch' convinced him to join and that he aimed to help the team gain promotion out of League Two. He made 34 appearances in the 2016–17 campaign, though agreed to a mutual termination of his contract after Curle told him he could not guarantee him playing time at Brunton Park next season.

Notts County
On 24 July 2017, Brisley signed a two-year contract with League Two side Notts County in a move that reunited him with former Leyton Orient boss Kevin Nolan. He scored his first goal for Notts County in his second appearances for the "Magpies", in an EFL Cup tie at Scunthorpe United on 8 August. He quickly found good form in a centre-back partnership with Richard Duffy and credited his new vegan diet for his increased fitness. He made 46 appearances in the 2017–18 campaign, helping County to reach the play-offs, where they were beaten by Coventry City at the semi-final stage. He was played in a holding midfield role by new manager Harry Kewell in October 2018. However he was dropped from the first-team by Kewell's successor, Neal Ardley, and was also criticised for his performances in the reserves by coach Steve Chettle. He left Meadow Lane after being released following the club's relegation out of the English Football League and into the National League at the end of the 2018–19 season.

Port Vale
On 30 August 2019, he signed for League Two side Port Vale on a one-year contract. He was signed by manager John Askey, who was his former youth-team manager at Macclesfield, but had to spend his first month with the "Valiants" building his fitness before taking his place on the bench as Leon Legge and Nathan Smith had established an effective centre-back partnership together. Injury to Smith allowed him a run in the first-team in late January and he quickly impressed with his performances, scoring the opening goal in a 3–2 victory at Forest Green Rovers on 11 February. His good form continued to keep Smith out of the first-team until his run of six matches was ended by a knee injury picked up in a 2–2 draw with Walsall on 22 February, a medial ligament problem which required five weeks of rest. He was nominated for the PFA League Two Player of the Month award for February. He was signed a new one-year contract after he ended the 2019–20 campaign with one goal in 14 appearances.

He started the 2020–21 season on the bench as Legge and Smith were established at centre-back. Despite establishing himself in a back three alongside Legge and Smith under new manager Darrell Clarke, he was released in the summer upon the expiry of his contract. His agent, Phil Sproson, said that Brisley was disappointed not to be offered a new deal considering his form and experience.

Wrexham
On 9 July 2021, Brisley dropped down to the National League to sign for Wrexham on a two-year deal. However he played just five games for Phil Parkinson's "Red Dragons" in the 2021–22 season and left the Racecourse Ground by mutual consent.

Buxton
On 7 July 2022, Brisley joined newly-promoted National League North club Buxton.

Style of play
Brisley's agency describes him as a defender noted for his "strength, physical presence, and defensive discipline". Port Vale coach Dave Kevan praised his attitude, reliability and distribution.

Personal life
Brisley turned vegan in 2017 after being introduced to the diet by his partner and credited it with improving his fitness.

Career statistics

Honours
Peterborough United
Football League Trophy: 2014

References

External links

Living people
1990 births
Sportspeople from Macclesfield
English footballers
Association football defenders
Macclesfield Town F.C. players
Peterborough United F.C. players
Scunthorpe United F.C. players
Leyton Orient F.C. players
Carlisle United F.C. players
Notts County F.C. players
Port Vale F.C. players
Wrexham A.F.C. players
Buxton F.C. players
English Football League players
National League (English football) players